Christopher Hikaru Nakamura (born December 9, 1987) is an American chess grandmaster, Twitch streamer, five-time U.S. Chess Champion, and the reigning World Fischer Random Chess Champion. A chess prodigy, he earned his grandmaster title at the age of 15, the youngest American at the time to do so. Nakamura won the 2011 edition of Tata Steel Chess Tournament Group A and has represented the United States at five Chess Olympiads, winning a team gold medal and two team bronze medals. With a peak rating of 2816, Nakamura is the tenth-highest rated player in history. In May 2014, when FIDE began publishing official rapid and blitz chess ratings, Nakamura ranked No. 1 in the world on both lists; he has remained at or near the No. 1 rank on both lists ever since.  he has won all of the last five Chess.com Speed Chess Championships.

Early life 
Nakamura was born in Hirakata, Osaka Prefecture, Japan, to an American mother, Carolyn Merrow Nakamura, a classically trained musician and former public school teacher, and a Japanese father, Shuichi Nakamura. Nakamura has an older brother, Asuka. When he was two years old, his family moved to the United States, and, a year later in 1990, his parents divorced. He was raised in White Plains, New York. He began playing chess at the age of seven and was coached by his Sri Lankan stepfather, FIDE Master and chess author Sunil Weeramantry. Weeramantry began coaching the Nakamura brothers after Asuka Nakamura won the National Kindergarten Championship in 1992, which led to him developing a relationship with their mother.

Chess prodigy 
At age 10, he became the youngest American to beat an International Master when he defeated Jay Bonin at the Marshall Chess Club. Also at age 10, Nakamura became the youngest player to achieve the title of chess master from the United States Chess Federation, breaking the record previously set by Vinay Bhat (Nakamura's record stood until 2008 when Nicholas Nip achieved the master title at the age of 9 years and 11 months). In 1999, Nakamura won the Laura Aspis Prize, given annually to the top USCF-rated player under age 13. In 2003, at age 15 years and 79 days, Nakamura solidified his reputation as a chess prodigy, becoming the youngest American to earn the grandmaster title at the time, breaking the record of Bobby Fischer by three months.

Chess career
In July 2002, Nakamura achieved 56th place at the 30th annual World Open tournament in Philadelphia.

In April 2004, Nakamura achieved a fourth-place finish in the "B" group at the Corus tournament at Wijk aan Zee, the Netherlands.

Nakamura qualified for the FIDE World Chess Championship 2004, played in Tripoli, Libya, and reached the fourth round, defeating grandmasters Sergey Volkov, Aleksej Aleksandrov, and Alexander Lastin before falling to England's Michael Adams, the tournament's third-seeded participant and eventual runner-up.

On June 20, 2005, Nakamura was selected as the 19th Frank Samford Chess Fellow, receiving a grant of $32,000 to further his chess education and competition.

Nakamura won the 2005 U.S. Chess Championship (held in November and December 2004), scoring seven points over nine rounds to tie grandmaster Alexander Stripunsky for first place. Nakamura defeated Stripunsky in two straight rapid playoff games to claim the title and become the youngest national champion since Fischer. Nakamura finished the tournament without a loss and, in the seventh round, defeated grandmaster Gregory Kaidanov, then the nation's top-ranked player.

Following that victory, Nakamura played a challenge match dubbed the "Duelo de Jóvenes Prodigios" in Mexico against Ukrainian grandmaster Sergey Karjakin (who now identifies as Russian) and defeated his fellow prodigy by 4½–1½.

In November and December 2005, Nakamura competed in the FIDE World Cup in Khanty-Mansiysk, Russia, seeded 28th (of 128 players) but failed to advance beyond the first round. He lost each of his two games to Indian grandmaster Surya Ganguly.

In 2006, Nakamura was offered a full scholarship to the University of Texas, Dallas but instead began attending Dickinson College, with a partial scholarship, in order to take a break from chess. Later in the year, he announced that he would resume playing. The same year, he helped the U.S. team win the bronze medal in the Chess Olympiad at Turin, Italy, playing on the third board behind Gata Kamsky and 2006 U.S. Champion Alexander Onischuk. In the same year, he won the 16th North American Open in Las Vegas.

In January 2007, Nakamura shared second place at the GibTelecom Masters in Gibraltar. He placed joint first in the tournament the following year, finishing with five straight wins to tie with Chinese GM Bu Xiangzhi, whom he then proceeded to beat in the rapidplay playoff.

In October 2007, Nakamura won the Magistral D'Escacs tournament in Barcelona and the Corsican circuit rapid chess tournament.

Nakamura won the 2008 Finet Chess960 Open in Mainz, Germany. In November 2008, he won the Cap d'Agde Rapid Tournament in Cap d'Agde, defeating Anatoly Karpov in the semifinals and Vassily Ivanchuk in the finals. In February 2009, he came joint third at the 7th Gibtelecom Masters in Gibraltar, again finishing strongly with 4½/5 to end the event on 7½/10.

2009: Second U.S. Championship and other tournament successes 
Nakamura won the 2009 U.S. Chess Championship (St Louis, Missouri, May 2009), scoring 7/9 to take clear first ahead of 17-year-old GM-elect Robert Hess, who shared second with 6½.

In July 2009, Nakamura won the Donostia-San Sebastian Chess Festival, tying with former FIDE world champion Ruslan Ponomariov with 6½/9 before defeating Ponomariov in a blitz playoff to win the title over a field including former undisputed world champion Anatoly Karpov, former FIDE world champions Rustam Kasimdzhanov and Ponomariov, 2009 World Junior champion Maxime Vachier-Lagrave, and Peter Svidler among others. In August 2009, Nakamura became the 960 World Chess Champion, beating GM Levon Aronian 3½–½ in Mainz, Germany.

In November 2009, Nakamura participated in the BNbank blitz tournament in Oslo, Norway. He reached the final by winning all 12 of his games. In the championship, he faced the world No. 2 and reigning World Blitz Champion Magnus Carlsen. Nakamura won the match 3–1, further cementing his reputation as one of the best blitz players in the world, despite having not been invited to the 2009 World Blitz championship.

Nakamura skipped the Chess World Cup 2009 in favor of the London Chess Classic in December 2009. Although he drew with the black pieces against eventual winner Magnus Carlsen and with white against former world champion Vladimir Kramnik, Nakamura failed to win a game during the tournament and ended in seventh place out of eight.

2010: Gold medalist and top-ten player 
Nakamura began 2010 playing first board for the United States at the World Team Chess Championship held in Bursa, Turkey. His performance, including a win over world No. 6 and recent FIDE World Cup winner Boris Gelfand on the black side of a King's Indian Defense, won him the individual gold medal for board one and led the U.S. to a second-place finish behind Russia.

Nakamura participated in the 2010 Corus tournament in Wijk aan Zee. He finished with +2, tying for fourth with Viswanathan Anand, behind Carlsen, Shirov, and Kramnik.

In May, Nakamura participated in the 2010 United States Chess Championship in Saint Louis, Missouri, attempting to defend his 2009 title. Seeded first, he scored 5/7 points to qualify for the round-robin stage against the 1991 champion Gata Kamsky, 2006 champion Alexander Onischuk, and 2008 champion Yuri Shulman. In the round-robin stage, he drew with Kamsky before losing to Shulman, with the white pieces in both games. The loss to Shulman eliminated him from defending his 2009 title.

Nakamura competed in the 39th Chess Olympiad. Although he defeated Lê Quang Liêm and drew Kramnik with the black pieces during the tournament, the U.S. team failed to medal.

From November 5–14, Nakamura competed in the 2010 Mikhail Tal Memorial in Moscow; the field consisted of world No. 3 Levon Aronian, world No. 4 Vladimir Kramnik, world No. 6 Alexander Grischuk, world No. 8 Shakhriyar Mamedyarov, world No. 9 Sergey Karjakin, Pavel Eljanov, Boris Gelfand, Alexei Shirov, and Wang Hao. The average Elo of the field was 2757, making it the third-strongest tournament in chess history at the time. Nakamura finished at +1, defeating Eljanov and drawing every other player to finish in a tie for fourth place and missing out on a tie for first place by blundering into a draw in a winning position in the final round against Grischuk. Nakamura's round two win over Eljanov placed him in the world top-ten in the live ratings for the first time in his career. Nakamura's performance at this tournament, his first involving an entirely super-elite field allowed him to "force (the chess elite) to respect him", according to noted Russian commentator grandmaster Sergey Shipov.

From November 16–18, Nakamura made his debut at the 2010 World Blitz Championship in Moscow. Despite a disastrous start and losing four of his first five games to Magnus Carlsen, Vladimir Kramnik, Maxime Vachier-Lagrave, and Sergey Karjakin, he recovered to score 5/7 in the second half of the day and finished with a score of 7½/14, 2½ points behind co-leaders Carlsen and Levon Aronian, whom he defeated in their individual games. On the second day, Nakamura avenged his earlier losses against both Carlsen and Kramnik and scored 8/14, for a total of 15½/28, three points behind Aronian and a point and a half behind Carlsen. Nakamura finished with 21½/38 for fifth place behind Gelfand, Carlsen, Teimour Radjabov and champion Aronian.

In December 2010, Nakamura finished fourth in the London Chess Classic, among a field including Anand, Carlsen, Kramnik, Michael Adams, Nigel Short, David Howell, and Luke McShane. This included a win with Black against Kramnik, evening their career head-to-head record at 2½/2½. The tournament was won by Magnus Carlsen. Nakamura's performance ensured that he would officially join the world top ten as of January 1, 2011.

2011: Tata Steel Group A victory
In the January 2011 FIDE rating list, Nakamura was ranked number 10 in the world with a rating of 2751.

Nakamura began training with former world champion Garry Kasparov. The first of several training sessions were held in New York at the beginning of January, but the training ended in December 2011.

From January 14 through 30, Nakamura competed in the Tata Steel Grandmaster A tournament in Wijk aan Zee among a field of world No. 1 and defending champion Magnus Carlsen, world champion and world No. 2 Viswanathan Anand, world No. 3 and reigning World Blitz champion Levon Aronian, world No. 4 and former world champion Vladimir Kramnik, world No. 7 Alexander Grischuk, former FIDE world champion Ruslan Ponomariov, reigning Russian champion Ian Nepomniachtchi, reigning Chinese champion Wang Hao, Maxime Vachier-Lagrave, Alexei Shirov, Anish Giri, Jan Smeets, and Erwin L'Ami. The average rating of the field was 2740, making this thirteen-round event a category 20 tournament. After twelve rounds, Nakamura was in clear first place with 8½ points going into the final round, half a point ahead of Anand and a full point ahead of Carlsen and Aronian. In the final round, Nakamura drew against Wang with the black pieces in a King's Indian Defense. With the draw, Nakamura finished with 9/13 (+5), a tournament performance rating of 2879, and guaranteed at least a share of first place. With Anand's final round draw against Nepomniachtchi, Nakamura clinched sole possession of first place, making him the first American to win the Wijk aan Zee tournament since 1980. The win also guaranteed that Nakamura would join Carlsen (winner of the 2010 Pearl Spring chess tournament) as qualifiers for Grand Slam Masters Final 2011 in September 2011. Nakamura after the tournament stated that his goal was to reach a 2800 rating by the end of the year; the win raised his rating from 2751 to 2774 and from world No. 10 to world No. 7 on the unofficial live rating list.

Kasparov called Nakamura's victory the best by an American in more than 100 years:

In an e-mail, Kasparov said, "Fischer never won a tournament ahead of the world champion. He was second in Santa Monica", referring to the Second Piatigorsky Cup. "Of course, there were far fewer such events back then, and Fischer had several great tournament results like Stockholm 62", the interzonal qualifier for the world championship. "Reuben Fine only equaled Keres on points at AVRO in 38." Referring to the breakout performance of Frank J. Marshall, the United States Champion from 1909 to 1936, Mr. Kasparov continued, "Then you have Marshall at Cambridge Springs in 1904 ahead of Lasker, though Tarrasch wasn't there. So unless you include Capablanca as an American player, I think you can go back to Pillsbury at Hastings 1895 for an American tournament victory on par with Nakamura's.

Following his super tournament triumph, Nakamura was given the key to the city of Memphis, Tennessee on February 15, 2011. The victory also opened the door for Nakamura to receive invitations from other super grandmaster tournaments for the first time, and increased his world ranking to a career-high number eight. In May, he contested a six-game match in the United States against world No. 11 Ponomariov, where he lost the first game but rallied to win the match 3½–2½, raising his rating to 2777 and ranking to world No. 6 on the unofficial live rating list, both career-highs to that date. From June 11–21, he made his debut at the Bazna Kings Tournament in Romania in a field including Carlsen, world No. 5 Vassily Ivanchuk, world No. 6 Sergey Karjakin, world No. 13 Teimour Radjabov and Liviu-Dieter Nisipeanu; the tournament was a Category XXI event with an average ELO of 2760, making it the third strongest tournament in history; Nakamura finished 4½/10; the tournament was won by Carlsen on tiebreak over Karjakin. Despite the disappointing performance at Bazna, he reached a new career-high world ranking of No. 6 in the July 2011 FIDE list with a 2770 rating.

From July 21–31, Nakamura made his debut at the Dortmund Invitational in Germany; the field comprised world No. 5 Kramnik, world No. 10 Ponomariov, world No. 27 Lê Quang Liêm, world No. 40 Giri, and Georg Meier. Nakamura had a second consecutive disappointing performance, beginning at −3 before winning his last two games, including a last-round win over tournament winner Kramnik on the black side of the King's Indian Defense, to finish at 4½/10.

Nakamura competed in the Grand Slam Masters Final 2011 in September, after which he played in the Tal Memorial for the second consecutive year in a field comprising Carlsen, Anand, Aronian, Karjakin, Kramnik, Ivanchuk, Gelfand, Hao, and Nepomniachtchi. He finished the year by participating in the London Chess Classic for the third consecutive time.

2012: Third U.S. Championship
Starting in 2012, he participated in the Reggio Emilia Tournament, tying for second with Alexander Morozevich of Russia and Fabiano Caruana of Italy. Anish Giri got first place in the tournament, a half-point ahead of the field. Nakamura then played in the Tata Steel Chess Tournament, finishing fifth. He won the US Championship in May with a score of 8½, one point ahead of Gata Kamsky.

In June 2012, Nakamura played at the Tal Memorial in Moscow. In a tightly bunched field, he finished tied for eighth with Luke McShane, 1½ points behind winner Magnus Carlsen. He participated in the Biel Chess Festival, finishing third with Anish Giri, behind Carlsen and Wang Hao. At the 2012 Chess Olympiad in August and September, he led the U.S. team to a fifth-place finish with a +4−1=4 record on the first board. Nakamura then suffered through the FIDE London Grand Prix tournament, at one point losing four games in a row. He finished tied for last with Giri. After another lackluster performance in the European Club Championship in Eilat, Israel, Nakamura finished first in the "crown group" at the Univé tournament in Hoogeveen, the Netherlands. In December he tied for third with Mickey Adams in the London Chess Classic with a +3−1=4 score. Nakamura finished the year by winning three silver medals in the three chess events (rapid, blitz and blindfold) at the World Mind Games in Beijing.
After this tournament, Nakamura achieved a 2844 FIDE blitz rating and a 2795 FIDE rapid rating.

After what was to him a disappointing tournament at the fifth edition of the King's Tournament in Medias (although Nakamura placed third of six among a cadre of top Grandmasters), Nakamura tweeted that he was focusing on the 2011 World Series of Poker, in which he played, although busted out on the second day. Kasparov, who had been training Nakamura at the time, publicly grumbled about his interest in poker.

2013: Top FIDE blitz rating

Nakamura began 2013 with a 7/13 (+3−2=8) result at the Tata Steel tournament in Wijk aan Zee, finishing sixth. He scored a win against then world number five Fabiano Caruana with the black pieces in an Old Indian Defense. He then played at the FIDE Grand Prix tournament in Zug, Switzerland in April, scoring 6½/11 (+3−1=7) and finishing clear second behind Veselin Topalov.

Nakamura did not participate in the 2013 U.S. championship. Instead, he played in the Norway Chess tournament, finishing tied with Magnus Carlsen for second behind winner Sergey Karjakin. His 5½/9 score (+4−2=3) featured a win over then-world champion Viswanathan Anand with the black pieces in a Ruy Lopez. He then scored 5/11 at the FIDE Grand Prix in Thessaloniki, Greece. Nakamura had an up-and-down Tal Memorial in June, at one point winning three straight games and then later losing three straight. He finished in sixth place with a 4½/9 score (+4−4=1). However, he won the blitz tournament before the classical competition, raising his FIDE blitz rating to 2879, first in the world at the time. In the World Cup in Tromsø, Norway, Nakamura scored 6/8 (+5−1=2), eventually losing in the fourth round to Anton Korobov. Nakamura finished second at the Sinquefield Cup in his hometown of St. Louis, behind Carlsen with a 3½/6 (+2−1=3) score, including a win over then world number two Levon Aronian.

At the FIDE Grand Prix in Paris, Nakamura scored 6½/11 (+3−1=7) and tied for third with Étienne Bacrot, behind co-winners Caruana and Boris Gelfand. He defeated Caruana in their individual encounter but lost to Gelfand. Overall, Nakamura finished sixth in the FIDE Grand Prix 2012–13 series. He then played first board for O.R. Padova in the European Club Championship in Rhodes, Greece and scored 4/6 (+2−0=4). He defeated current Russian champion Peter Svidler with the black pieces in an extremely sharp King's Indian Defense. At the World Team Chess Championship in Antalya, Turkey, Nakamura led the U.S. team to a fourth-place finish. His personal record of 4½/7 (+3−1=3) earned him an individual silver medal on board one. Nakamura closed out his tournament schedule for the year with a win at the London Chess Classic, which was converted to a rapid chess event in 2013. He won his pool in the first stage of the tournament, then defeated Nigel Short, Vladimir Kramnik, and Boris Gelfand in the knockout stage. His overall record was +5−0=7.

2014: No. 3 ranking and Zurich Chess Challenge
Entering 2014, Nakamura had achieved a No. 3 position in the FIDE ratings, below Carlsen and Aronian. He began his 2014 schedule with a ninth-place finish in the Tata Steel Chess Tournament at Wijk Aan Zee, with a 5/11 score (+2−3=6). He then played the Zurich Chess Challenge, drawing with Caruana in the first round and winning against Anand in the second. In the third round, Nakamura achieved a winning position against Carlsen but later made several mistakes and eventually lost the game. Nakamura finished fourth of the six players in the event, with a 7½/15 score.

In April, Nakamura finished third of the six players in the Gashimov Memorial. In the double round-robin event, he lost both of his games to Carlsen but defeated Shakhriyar Mamedyarov twice to close with a 5/10 score (+2−2=6). He then played a four-game match against Czech grandmaster David Navara in June and won easily 3½/4.

In November, Nakamura played a match against Levon Aronian consisting of four classical and sixteen blitz games. The two tied the classical games 2–2; Nakamura won the match with a 9½–6½ score in blitz games.

2015: 2800 rating and fourth U.S. Championship
On the February 2015 FIDE rating list, Nakamura fell behind Wesley So, the first time since January 2013 that Nakamura had not been the top FIDE-ranked player in the United States.

In January, Nakamura won the Gibraltar Chess Masters tournament, scoring 8½/10 (+7−0=3). In February, Nakamura won the Zurich Chess Challenge after a playoff event to settle a tie. Nakamura had one of his best-ever months as a chess professional in February 2015, and as a result on the March FIDE classical list Nakamura moved to his then-career highest 2798 and No. 3 in the world. That April, Nakamura won his fourth U.S. Chess Championship with a score of 8/11. In the final stage of the 4-stage Grand Prix event, Nakamura finished equal first with Fabiano Caruana and Dmitry Jakovenko with 6½ out of 11 points at Khanty-Mansiysk, giving him an overall second place Grand Prix placement, which automatically qualified him for the Candidates tournament to determine the challenger for Magnus Carlsen in the next Chess World Championship. In the first stage of the June Norway Chess tournament for the Grand Chess Tour, Nakamura finished equal second with Viswanathan Anand with 6 out of 9 points and a 2900 performance. This gave Nakamura 8 points in the first leg of the Grand Chess Tour. It also propelled his rating to a career-high of 2814 and put him at number 4 in the July 2015 world rankings.

2016–2018
In February 2016, Nakamura won the Gibraltar Chess Festival for the second year in a row, scoring 8/10 (+6−0=4) and beating Maxime Vachier-Lagrave on tiebreaks. That same month, he also won the Zurich Chess Challenge for the second year in a row. He tied with Viswanathan Anand on the number of points; however, Nakamura was declared the overall winner due to his higher Sonneborn–Berger score. In March 2016, Nakamura came seventh out of eight in the Candidates Tournament 2016, which decided the challenger—Sergey Karjakin—to face Magnus Carlsen for the World Chess Championship. He scored 7/14, as did the three players directly above him. In September 2016, Nakamura was part of the U.S. team that won the 42nd Chess Olympiad that took place in Baku, Azerbaijan.

In January–February 2017, Nakamura won the Gibraltar Chess Festival with a score of 8/10 points (+6−0=4) and beating David Antón Guijarro in the tie-break final by 1½–½.

In January 2018, Nakamura took second place in the Chess.com Speed Chess Championships after winning matches in 2017 with Sergey Grigoriants, Fabiano Caruana, and then-World Blitz Champion Sergey Karjakin, only losing to Carlsen in the January finals. That February, Nakamura participated in the unofficial Chess960 Championship, losing 10–14 to Carlsen. From May 28 to June 7, he competed in the sixth edition of Norway Chess, placing third with 4½/8 (+1–0=7). The Paris Grand Chess Tour Rapid and Blitz tournament took place 20 to 24 June 2018. Nakamura won the event with 23 points, ahead of Sergei Karjakin with 21½ points and Wesley So who had 21 points. Nakamura won the St. Louis Rapid & Blitz tournament that ran from 11 to 15 August 2018.

Nakamura won the Rapid portion of the inaugural Tata Steel India Chess tournament, held in November 2018 in Kolkata. He also finished runner-up, losing 1½–½ in a tiebreaker to Viswanathan Anand, in the blitz portion of the same event. From December 11–17, Nakamura defeated Fabiano Caruana with a score of 18–10 in the semifinal match at the London Chess Classic and, in the final match with Maxime Vachier-Lagrave, scored a victory in the fourth and final blitz game after the previous seven games were drawn. Nakamura thus won the 2018 Grand Chess Tour.

2019: Fifth U.S. Championship
In March, Nakamura won his fifth U.S. Chess Championship by a score of 8/11.

In April, Nakamura won the Bullet Chess Championship hosted by Chess.com. Defeating Grandmasters Alireza Firouzja and Levon Aronian in the quarterfinals and the semifinals, respectively, he then defeated Ukrainian Grandmaster Olexandr Bortnyk to win the tournament.

In early May, Nakamura shared second place with French grandmaster Maxime Vachier-Lagrave in the first leg of the 2019 Grand Chess Tour which was held in Côte d’Ivoire. The tournament was a combination rapid & blitz format, with world champion Magnus Carlsen placing first.

In late May, Hikaru participated in the Moscow FIDE Grand Prix tournament, which is part of the qualification cycle for the 2020 World Chess Championship. The tournament was a 16-player event. Nakamura defeated grandmasters Teimour Radjabov and Daniil Dubov but lost to grandmaster Alexander Grischuk in the semi-final match.

In early September, Hikaru participated in the Champions Showdown: Chess 9LX tournament, which featured seven other grandmasters playing a 4-day match in Chess960. Players faced one opponent only the entire event. Hikaru was paired against Levon Aronian. Despite scoring only half a point out of 8 at the start of the match, Hikaru eventually defeated Aronian by a score of 14½ to 11½.

2020: Magnus Carlsen Chess Tour 
Nakamura started 2020 as the top-ranked blitz chess player in the world. Owing to the COVID-19 pandemic, chess moved online, with Nakamura playing an important role in popularizing it.

Since April 2020, Nakamura participated in the Magnus Carlsen Chess Tour with a prize pool of $1 million. He won the group stage of Magnus Carlsen Invitational and finished second behind Magnus Carlsen. He beat Carlsen in the semi-finals of Lindores Abbey Rapid Challenge but finished second, losing to eventual champion Daniil Dubov in the final. Nakamura qualified for the Magnus Carlsen Chess Tour Finals against Carlsen, where he took his opponent to seven matches before drawing an armageddon tiebreaker game as white, thus losing the match. The world champion praised Nakamura after the match, saying, "he played a great match, he made it extremely difficult for me".

In September, Nakamura tied for first with Carlsen in Champions Showdown: Chess 9LX and finished third in St. Louis Rapid & Blitz.

After many victories in shorter tournaments on Chess.com, including Titled Tuesday and Super Swiss, Nakamura failed to defend his U.S. Chess Champion title, finishing seventh. The tournament, which took place online in a rapid format, was won by Wesley So.

In October, Nakamura held a 77-board charity simultaneous exhibition online, raising around $9,500 for Doctors Without Borders. Before the 2020 United States presidential election, he challenged President Barack Obama to a game of chess to raise funds for the presidential nominee Joe Biden’s victory fund and ActBlue.

Nakamura won the Chess.com Speed Chess Championship in December. It was his third victory in the format. The site promoted the knockout tournament by emphasizing a possible rematch of Nakamura and world champion Magnus Carlsen in the final. However, French grandmaster Maxime Vachier-Lagrave defeated Carlsen in their semi-final match earning a spot in the final against Nakamura. In the Speed Chess Championship final, Nakamura defeated Vachier-Lagrave by a score of 18½ to 12½. Nakamura's skill at bullet chess proved to be the deciding factor, as he beat Vachier-Lagrave 8–3 in the bullet section of the match. Previous to the final Nakamura had defeated grandmasters Haik Martirosyan 21–5, Vladimir Fedoseev 21½–5½, and Wesley So 13½–12½.

Since November, Nakamura participated in the Champions Chess Tour 2021, qualifying for the knockout stage of Skilling Open and Airthings Masters. After losing in the quarterfinals of the second event to Levon Aronian, Nakamura and his team held a charity stream, raising over $358,000 for CARE.

2021: Champions Chess Tour and return to over-the-board chess 
Nakamura continued to play the Champions Chess Tour with the Opera Euro Rapid tournament in February 2021. In the initial round-robin phase of the tournament, Nakamura compiled an up-and-down record. His final round-robin game against fellow American grandmaster Sam Shankland was pivotal. A win or draw in the game would have secured Nakamura's qualification to the tournament's knockout phase. He obtained a winning position against Shankland but failed to convert the advantage and eventually lost the game. This resulted in his exclusion from the knockout phase based on tiebreaks with Russian grandmaster Daniil Dubov.

In the Magnus Carlsen Invitational, the next tournament on the Champions Chess Tour, Nakamura scored +3−0=12 to place fourth in the preliminary stage and thus qualified for the knockout phase. He then lost his two-day quarterfinal match against Russian GM Ian Nepomniachtchi. He drew 2–2 with Nepomniachtchi on the first day but lost 2½–½ on the second day.

Nakamura scored +4−0=11 in the preliminary stage of the New In Chess Classic, the fifth event of the Champions Chess Tour, thus finishing second and qualifying for the tournament's knockout stage. After defeating Lê Quang Liêm and Shakhriyar Mamedyarov in the quarterfinals and semifinals, respectively, he lost to Magnus Carlsen 3–1 in the first match of the final and drew the second match 2–2, thus losing the final and finishing in second place. Nakamura qualified for the knockouts of the other two events, FTX Crypto Cup and Chessable Masters, finishing in the overall fifth place in the Tour after showing the second strongest performance in the Tour Final.

In August 2021, Nakamura won the Saint Louis Rapid and Blitz competition without a single loss in his first over-the-board tournament since before the COVID-19 pandemic. He had three wins and six draws in the rapid portion, as well as six wins and twelve draws in the blitz portion.

In December 2021, he won Chess.com's 2021 Speed Chess Championship by defeating GM Wesley So 23–8 in the final match. This was his fourth successive victory in this event.

From 26 to 28 December 2021, Nakamura participated in the 2021 World Rapid Chess Championship in Warsaw, where he ended up in sixth place after tiebreaks. On the 29th he played the first leg of the 2021 World Blitz Chess Championship, but had to forfeit the tournament due to testing positive for COVID-19.

2022: FIDE Grand Prix, second Candidates, and World Fischer Random Championship 

Nakamura was granted a wildcard entry to the FIDE Grand Prix 2022 in December 2021 by the FIDE President. In the first leg of the tournament held in Berlin in February 2022, he played in Pool A alongside Andrey Esipenko, Étienne Bacrot, and Alexander Grischuk, making it his first classical tournament in two years. Through five rounds, he held a 3½/5 (+2−0=3) lead in his group. Following a thriller against Esipenko in the sixth round, Nakamura held a draw with black to win his group and advance to the semifinals to face Richárd Rapport. With white, he convincingly won a complicated rook-and-pawn endgame to take a 1–0 lead in the semifinals. He held a draw in the following game to advance to the finals against Levon Aronian. The classical portion was drawn, but he won in rapid 2–0 to win the first leg of the tournament.

On March 18, Nakamura won the 2022 edition of the Bullet Chess Championship hosted by chess.com, beating Andrew Tang in the final.

Entering the third and final leg of the FIDE Grand Prix 2022, Nakamura was ranked second in the Grand Prix standings with 13 points. He played in Pool A alongside Andrey Esipenko, Grigoriy Oparin, and Levon Aronian, who was ranked third in the standings entering the tournament with 10 points. On March 28, Nakamura defeated Esipenko to finish a 4/6 run in the round-robin stage, guaranteeing him at least second place and qualifying him for the Candidates Tournament 2022. On March 31, after a draw in the semi-finals against Shakhriyar Mamedyarov, he secured first place in the Grand Prix standings, thus winning the Grand Prix 2022 series. He would eventually proceed to defeat Mamedyarov by drawing in classical and proceeding to rapid tiebreakers, where he won the tiebreakers in a 2–0 sweep. This briefly propelled Nakamura to the highest live rapid chess rating on April 1, surpassing Magnus Carlsen, though Carlsen regained his number one spot after Nakamura lost to Wesley So on tiebreakers in the finals of the third leg of the Grand Prix. From June 16 to July 4, Nakamura participated in the 2022 Candidates Tournament, finishing in fourth place with a score of 7½/14.

On June 14 Nakamura joined Misfits Gaming Group as a content creator and influencer. Hans Niemann filed a $100 million lawsuit against Nakamura and others on October 20. (See Carlsen–Niemann controversy.) Later in October Nakamura won the second World Fischer Random Chess Championship ahead of reigning World Fischer Random Champion Wesley So, World Classical Champion Magnus Carlsen, World Rapid Champion Nodirbek Abdusattorov, and runner-up World Chess Championship 2021 contender Ian Nepomniachtchi, defeating the latter in armageddon. In December Nakamura won his fifth straight Speed Chess Championship, defeating Magnus Carlsen 14.5 v. 13.5 in the final.  On December 30 Nakamura finished as the runner-up in the World Blitz Chess Championship 2022 with a score of 15/21 behind Magnus Carlsen.

2023
In February Nakamura participated in the Airthings Masters 2023 and finished as the runner-up of the tournament behind Magnus Carlsen.

Playing style
Nakamura is particularly skilled at rapid and blitz chess, a variety of time controls in which players have less than an hour to complete all or most of their moves.  Nakamura is ranked No. 2 on the FIDE blitz list and was previously ranked No. 1 on the rapid list. He is also strong at bullet chess, a time control giving the players one minute each. In 2009, Nakamura authored the book Bullet Chess: One Minute to Mate. Nakamura said in September 2020, "At least at blitz chess, I'm probably the best or second-best player ever, in the entire history, at least online."

Nakamura has been nicknamed "The H Bomb" because of his explosive style of playing.

Nakamura's long-time second is USCF National Master Kris Littlejohn, who works with chess engines to prepare lines for Nakamura to play.

Chess records
Nakamura has set several "youngest-ever" records in U.S. chess history, including:
Youngest to defeat an International Master in a USCF-rated game (10 years, 0 months); later surpassed by Praveen Balakrishnan at 9 years 29 days, and then by Awonder Liang at 8 years 118 days;
Youngest to defeat a Grandmaster in a USCF-rated game (10 years, 117 days); later surpassed by Fabiano Caruana at 10 years, 61 days; then surpassed by Awonder Liang at 9 years 112 days;
Youngest International Master (13 years, 2 months); later surpassed by Ray Robson at 13 years, 1 month, by Samuel Sevian at 12 years, 10 months, and then by Awonder Liang at 12 years, 7 months and 6 days old.

Internet activity
Nakamura has played on the Internet Chess Club (as "Capilanobridge"; formerly as "Smallville") and Playchess (as "Star Wars"). He served as a commentator and game annotator on the ChessNinja website, operated by chess author Mig Greengard.

Nakamura is sponsored by Chess.com, a chess website. In 2018, Nakamura began streaming on the platform Twitch under the name "GMHikaru". He plays speed chess games, variously against grandmasters, other streamers, and viewers who pay to subscribe to his channel. He may play blindfolded or with piece handicaps, such as odds of a queen. He also reviews his tournament games on stream. In 2020, during the COVID-19 pandemic, chess became significantly more popular on Twitch, with Nakamura widely identified as a significant reason for this. His channel received a tenfold increase in audience size between February and June 2020. Around August 2020, Nakamura averaged 14,000 viewers and streamed on Twitch on most days. By September 2020, he had reached 500,000 followers. Nakamura often plays games using "joke openings" while on stream, including the Bongcloud Attack, the Jerome Gambit and the Botez Gambit. Nakamura has stated that he prioritizes his streaming career over his chess playing career.

On August 27, 2020, Nakamura signed with the esports organization Team SoloMid (TSM) for a six-figure sum, making him one of the first chess players to join an esports team. He operates a Discord server named "Naka's PogUniversity" and has a Twitter account. Nakamura also has a YouTube channel, which had over 1.24M subscribers , up from 78,000 subscribers in the beginning of 2020. When asked about his popularity online, Nakamura attributed it to "the ability to play extremely high-level chess" while "seemingly ... not focused on the game" and conversing with his viewers. Nathan Grayson of Kotaku called it a "combination of teacherly wisdom, galaxy-brained skills, and uncommon expressiveness".

Nakamura has also coached beginner chess players on his Twitch platform, including the streamer xQc. He gave lessons to players in PogChamps, an amateur tournament for Twitch streamers hosted by Chess.com, and its sequel, PogChamps 2. He additionally provided commentary. At its peak, the tournament was the most-watched channel on Twitch for a short period, with 63,000 viewers. Nakamura told Kotaku that though the competition had been met with some criticism, he believed that such tournaments with varying levels of skills among players could become popular. On February 14, 2021, PogChamps 3 began. During the xQc vs. Rubius match on the second day of the event, chess hit its all-time high of 115,000 viewers in the chess category on Twitch.

On February 14, 2021, Nakamura reached a milestone of one million followers on his Twitch channel, GMHikaru. During the FIDE Grand Prix in March 2022, Twitch suspended Nakamura for three days (later reduced to two days) after he broadcast and commented on chess games being played by Dr Disrespect, who is permanently suspended from the streaming platform.

Other activities
Nakamura appeared as himself in season 5, episode 2 of the Showtime series Billions, which premiered May 10, 2020. Nakamura is also an active stock market investor. In April 2017, he appeared on Bloomberg Television to discuss the relationship between chess and stock trading. During his chess streams Nakamura occasionally discusses stock market investing and general financial topics.

Notable games

 Nakamura vs. Boris Gelfand, World Team Championship 2010, King's Indian Defense: Orthodox Variation (E97) 0–1 Nakamura leaves his queen able to be captured four times in this win.
 Nakamura vs. Michal Krasenkow, Casino de Barcelona 2007, English Opening, Agincourt Defense (A14) 0–1 Nakamura sacrifices his queen to chase Krasenkow's king up the board.
 The following game is Nakamura–Igor Novikov, played in the 29th New York Masters 2002. Nakamura's annotations are given along with the text. 

1. e4 c5 2. Nf3 d6 3. d4 cxd4 4. Nxd4 Nf6 5. Nc3 a6 6. Be3 e6 7. f3 b5 8. Qd2 Nbd7 9. g4 Nb6 10. 0-0-0 Bb7 11. Nb3 Rc8 12. Na5 Ba8 13. a4 This rare line has only been played two times, both games were draws. (13.g5 Nfd7 14.a4 b4 15.Na2 Nxa4 16.Bxa6 Qxa5 17.Bxc8 Ndb6 Perez–Novikov, Aosta Open Italy 2002.) 13... Nc4 13...d5 14.g5 Nfd7 15.exd5 Bxd5 16.axb5 Bb4 17.Nc6 Bxc6 18.bxc6 Rxc6 19.Bxb6 Rxb6 20.Qd4 0-0 21.Na4! Rb8 22.Qxd7 Qxg5+ 23.f4 Qxf4+ 24.Kb1 Andreev–Voitsekhovsky, 2000. 14. Nxc4 bxc4 15. Qd4 Qc7 16. g5 Nd7 17. f4 17.h4 e5 18.Qa7 Qxa7 19.Bxa7 h6 20.Bh3 De la Villa Garcia–Suba, Benasque Open 1995. 17... h6 18. g6!? The idea behind sacrificing the pawn is to weaken the e6 and g6 pawns, and force Black to move his king to f7. (18.gxh6 Rxh6 19.f5 Rh7 [19...Rh4 20.fxe6 fxe6 21.Bf2 Rh7 22.Bg3!+/=] 20.fxe6.) 18... fxg6 Novikov accepts the challenge. Perhaps f5 was better because once he takes on g6 his pieces get tied down, and Black ends up with a very passive position. (18...f5!? 19.Bg2 Nf6~~.) 19. Rg1 Kf7 19...e5?! 20.Qd2 g5 (20...exf4 21.Bxf4 Qb6 22.Rxg6 Rb8 23.b3 cxb3 24.Re6+ Kf7 25.Bc4+/−; 20...Qb7 21.Qd5 Qxd5 22.Nxd5+/=) 21.fxg5 hxg5 22.Nd5+/=. 20. f5 gxf5 20...exf5 21.exf5 gxf5 22.Bh3→. 21. exf5 e5 22. Qh4 Missing a chance to get a winning position. (22.Qg4! Nf6 23.Qg6+ Ke7 24.Bg2+/−.) 22... Nf6 23. Be2 Ke8 24. Rg6 Qf7 25. Qg3 Rb8 26. a5! Bc6 27. Bb6 h5 This is the only move which makes any sense here, but it allows White to win the exchange. Maybe Novikov felt like giving up the exchange to get some counterplay because if he does not play h5 White has all the play. 28. Qh4 d5 29. Qg3 Qe7 30. Bd4! Rxb2 31. Kxb2 exd4 32. Rxd4 Qa3+ 33. Kb1 Bd6 33...Qb4+ 34.Kc1 Bd6~~ After the game, when I analyzed with Novikov, he suggested this line. I did not find anything which was winning for White, and I think that Black is at least even in this position, if not better. 34. Qe3+ Kd8 (see diagram) 35. Nxd5 Clearly Novikov did not see this brilliant tactical shot as he used up most of his time trying to come up with a good move. In the end he had to settle for a losing endgame down an exchange. 35... Qxe3 35...Bxd5 36.Qxa3 Bxa3 37.Bxc4 Bc5 38.Rd3; 35...Qxa5 36.Nxf6 Qe1+ 37.Qc1+−; 35...Nxd5 36.Qxa3 Bxa3 37.Rxc6+−. 36. Nxe3 Kc7 37. Rxg7+ Nd7 38. Nxc4 Rb8+ 39. Nb6 Re8 40. Bf3 Re1+ 41. Ka2 Ra1+! Desperation. 42. Kxa1 Be5 43. c3 Bxg7 44. Bxc6 Bxd4 45. cxd4  45.cxd4 Kxc6 46.d5+ Kd6 47.Nxd7 Kxd7 48.f6+−.

Awards and nominations

References

External links

 
 
 
 
 
 
 
 Hikaru Nakamura's Live Chess Rating Statistics

1987 births
Living people
People from Hirakata
Chess grandmasters
Chess Olympiad competitors
American chess players
American sportspeople of Japanese descent
Japanese emigrants to the United States
Twitch (service) streamers
American YouTubers